Hanley is a town in Stoke-on-Trent, Staffordshire, England.

Hanley may also refer to:

People
 Hanley (name)

Places

Canada
 Hanley, Saskatchewan, a town
Hanley (Saskatchewan electoral district)

United Kingdom
 Hanley Castle, a village and civil parish in Worcestershire, England
 Hanley Castle (castle), a 13th-century castle in the village of Hanley Castle
 Hanley, Worcestershire, is a civil parish in Worcestershire, England
 Hanley Child, a place in that civil parish
 Hanley William, a place in that civil parish

Other uses
 William Hanley Trophy, awarded to the Most Sportsmanlike Player in the Ontario Hockey League

See also
 Handley (disambiguation)
 Hanle (disambiguation)
 Hanly